Fiesta Fatal! is the 1993 debut album by B-Tribe. Described by AllMusic as sounding like "the music of Vangelis with a Spanish flavor", its title track was a European hit.

Track listing
"Intro: Sueno del Cielo" - 1:13
"Fiesta Fatal!" (Album Edit) – Theme from Belfast Child, Traditional - 5:59
"Nadie Entiende"  - 4:12
"Lo Siento" - 4:45
"Una Vez Mas"   - 4:43
"Love, Tears, Heartache + Devotion" – Theme from Erik Satie  - 5:32
"Don't Be Emotional" - 4:14
"You Won't See Me Cry" – Theme from Vangelis' "I'll Find My Way Home" - 5:25
"Te Quiero – Interlude" - 1:07
"Reprise: Fiesta Fatal!" - 5:19
"Fiesta Fatal! (Barcelona Tribe Megamix)" – Theme from Belfast Child (CD bonus track) - 7:34

References

1993 debut albums
B-Tribe albums
Atlantic Records albums